Cyril Albert Alden (6 November 1887 – 25 June 1965) was an English cyclist who competed at the 1920 Olympic Games in Antwerp and in 1924 in Paris.

At the 1920 Olympics at Antwerp, Alden won two silver medals when he was second in the 50 km race and was part of the British team in the team pursuit that finished second behind Italy. Alden also competed at the 1924 Olympics and came second in the 50 km race.

References

External links
Cyril Alden @ sports-reference.com

1887 births
1965 deaths
English male cyclists
English Olympic medallists
Olympic cyclists of Great Britain
Cyclists at the 1920 Summer Olympics
Cyclists at the 1924 Summer Olympics
Olympic silver medallists for Great Britain
Olympic medalists in cycling
Cyclists from Greater London
Medalists at the 1920 Summer Olympics
Medalists at the 1924 Summer Olympics